Gayme Show (stylized as GAYME SHOW!) is an American unscripted comedy show that debuted April 6, 2020 as a part of the premiere content roll out for mobile streaming service Quibi.

In each episode, two straight-identifying contestants go head-to-head with a celebrity “life partner” as they face a series of physical and mental challenges. The winner of each round is given the tongue-in-cheek title of “Queen of the Straights.”

The show was created, written and is hosted by comedians Dave Mizzoni and Matt Rogers.

In June 2020, it was announced the series was renewed for a second season. The future of the series is unknown following Quibi's shutdown in December 2020. It did move with the rest of Quibi's library to The Roku Channel in 2021.

Vonzell Solomon sings the show's theme song as well as the transitions in between rounds.

Episodes

References

External links

2020 American television series debuts
2020s American LGBT-related comedy television series
Quibi original programming
American comedy web series
American LGBT-related web series
Gay-related television shows